Parisina is a 586-line poem written by Lord Byron. It was probably written between 1812 and 1815, and published on 13 February 1816.

It is based on a story related by Edward Gibbon in his Miscellaneous Works (1796) about Niccolò III d'Este, one of the dukes of Ferrara in the 15th century. Niccolò found out that Parisina Malatesta, his second wife, had an incestuous relationship with his bastard son Ugo and had both of them put to death.

In Byron's poem, Azo (his version of Niccolò) learns of the affair when Parisina mutters the name of Hugo (Ugo) in her sleep. In another embellishment by Byron, Parisina and Hugo were engaged to be married before Azo decided to marry her. Also, Azo sentences only Hugo to death; Parisina's fate is unknown, except for the fact that she is forced to witness Hugo's execution and utters a shriek that indicates approaching madness. Azo is tormented by his decision.

Operas
 Parisina by Gaetano Donizetti, after a libretto by Felice Romani modeled on Byron
 Parisina by Pietro Mascagni, after Gabriele D'Annunzio's libretto who adapted Byron's poem

Gallery

External links
Parisina, the full text of Byron's poem

Poetry by Lord Byron
1816 poems
Cultural depictions of Parisina Malatesta